Joseph E. Irish (August 7, 1833 – May 2, 1899) was a member of the Wisconsin State Senate.

Irish was born on August 7, 1833 in Paris, New York. He attended the Oneida Conference Seminary. In 1859, Irish became a preacher of the Methodist Episcopal Church. He was later chaplain to the 19th Infantry Regiment and the 8th Cavalry Regiment of the United States Army from 1892 to 1896. That year, Irish suffered a paralyzing stroke that he never fully recovered from. He died on May 2, 1899.

Political career
Irish represented the 24th District from 1872 to 1873. He was the first clergyman to serve in the Senate. Other positions Irish held include County Surveyor of Richland County, Wisconsin, Register of the U.S. Land Office in Eau Claire, Wisconsin and U.S. Consul in Cognac, France. He was a Republican.

References

People from Paris, New York
People from Richland County, Wisconsin
Politicians from Eau Claire, Wisconsin
Republican Party Wisconsin state senators
American consuls
American surveyors
Religious leaders from Wisconsin
American Methodist clergy
19th-century Methodist ministers
Methodist chaplains
1833 births
1899 deaths
United States Army chaplains
Military personnel from Wisconsin
19th-century American politicians
19th-century American clergy